Enea Zuffi (27 December 1891 – 14 July 1968) was an Italian footballer who played as a forward and midfielder.

Biography 
Zuffi was born in Turin, Italy, on 27 December 1891 to mother Alice Drake and father Enea Zuffi. At a club level, he played for both teams from his hometown, Torino F.C. and Juventus F.C. He played nine games with Torino from 1908 to 1910 and scored one goal, and played twenty-one games with Juventus from 1910 to 1912. He then returned to Torino for the 1912-1913 season, appearing in five games. In 1909, Zuffi was a member of the Torino XI that participated in the 1909 Sir Thomas Lipton Trophy, regarded by many as the first European club trophy. In the tournament, he scored the winning goal of a 2-1 victory over Sportfreunde Stuttgart to secure his team a third-place finish.

In 1912, Zuffi was a member of the Italian national squad that played in the 1912 Summer Olympics. He was present for three games, playing in two of them. He made his debut on 29 June, in a 2-3 loss to Finland, meaning they would now dispute the consolation tournament, where he sat on the bench against Sweden on 1 July as Italy won 1-0, and finally, on 3 July, he played against Austria in yet another loss (1-5).

Zuffi died on 14 July 1968 at the age of 76.

References

External links
Profile  at FIGC.it
Profile at myJuve.it

1891 births
1969 deaths
Italian footballers
Torino F.C. players
Juventus F.C. players
Italy international footballers
Association football forwards
Footballers from Turin
Footballers at the 1912 Summer Olympics
Olympic footballers of Italy